Rona Daniels (born July 8, 1969) is an American former professional tennis player.

Daniels reached a best singles ranking of 242 on the professional tour and her best WTA Tour performance was a third round appearance at the 1986 Argentinian Open. She played collegiate tennis for the University of Miami.

Since leaving professional tennis she has had a career in real estate.

References

External links
 
 

1969 births
Living people
American female tennis players
Miami Hurricanes women's tennis players